Laurel Beeler is currently a U.S. Magistrate Judge of the United States District Court for the Northern District of California.

Education
Judge Beeler received an A.B. degree, with honors, from Bowdoin College and graduated, with honors, from University of Washington School of Law with a Juris Doctor degree, where she was Order of the Coif and an Articles Editor on the Washington Law Review.

Career
After graduation from law school, Beeler served as a Staff Attorney (1989-1990) and Civil Appeals Division Chief (1990-1992) at the Office of Staff Attorneys for the U.S. Court of Appeals for the Ninth Circuit. From 1992-1994, Beeler served as a judicial law clerk for the Honorable Cecil F. Poole, U.S. Circuit Judge of the U.S. Court of Appeals for the Ninth Circuit. Upon completing her clerkship, Beeler then joined the Office of the U.S. Attorney for the Northern District of California as an Assistant U.S. Attorney, where she worked for 14 years from 1995 to 2009. At the U.S. Attorney's Office, Beeler held leadership positions such as the Deputy Chief of the Criminal Division, Major Crimes Supervisor, and Professional Responsibility Officer.

Judicial service
On January 4, 2010, Beeler was appointed as a U.S. Magistrate Judge for the Northern District of California. She replaced the seat vacated by retiring U.S. Magistrate Judge Wayne Brazil.  Beeler is a member of the Ninth Circuit Magistrate Judge Executive Board and the Ninth Circuit Criminal Case Committee. Beeler is also currently one of the four national judicial liaisons to the U.S. Department of Justice/Office of Defender Services Joint Electronic Technology Working Group. Beeler additionally chairs the Northern District of California’s Criminal Practice Committee and has implemented the Northern District’s reentry and diversion courts. She has also trained as a mediator with the Northern District’s Alternative Dispute Resolution (ADR) Program, the Federal Judicial Center, and Harvard Law School.

Beeler has also previously served as President of the Federal Bar Association, the Co-chair of the Lawyer Representatives to the Ninth Circuit, a Board Member of the Bar Association of San Francisco (“BASF”), and as a member of the Ninth Circuit’s Jury Trial Improvement Committee. She is also a member of the Executive Committee of the Edward J. McFetridge American Inn of Court.

She has also taught Civil Trial Practice at the University of California Berkeley School of Law and Criminal Procedure at the University of California Hastings College of the Law. Beeler has also led rule-of-law projects in Indonesia, Vietnam, Cambodia, the Philippines, Jordan, Ukraine, Turkey, and Thailand.

Accolades
In 2006,  Beeler received the Northern District of California Judicial Conference’s Public Service Award. In 2012, she was also named one of The Recorder’s Women Leaders in Law.  She additionally received BASF’s Barristers Choice Award in 2015 and the San Francisco Trial Lawyers Association’s Magistrate Judge of the Year award in 2018.

Notable Decisions
On September 20, 2020, Judge Beeler granted a motion for an injunction temporarily halting President Trump’s Executive Order banning the operation of Chinese social media application WeChat, citing potential First Amendment harms and the elimination of a major means of communication used by the Chinese American community as reasons for ruling so in the Order.

See also
United States District Court for the Northern District of California
United States Court of Appeals for the Ninth Circuit

References

External links

The Honorable Laurel Beeler, U.S. Magistrate Judge, United States District Court for the Northern District of California
Ballotpedia: Judge Laurel Beeler

Living people
American lawyers
Bowdoin College alumni
United States magistrate judges
People from San Francisco
21st-century American judges
University of Washington School of Law alumni
Year of birth missing (living people)